Robert "RJ" Scaringe (born January 19, 1983) is an American entrepreneur and engineer, the founder and CEO of electric vehicle manufacturer Rivian. Scaringe's net worth is estimated at US$1.7 billion as of December 2021.

Early life and education
Robert Joseph Scaringe was born on January 19, 1983. His father, also named Robert Scaringe, is an engineer and founder of Mainstream Engineering Corporation. Scaringe grew up a car enthusiast, restoring them in his neighbor's garage. After learning of the great negative environmental effects of cars, however, he decided to focus his life on creating a more sustainable and environmentally friendly transportation system.

Scaringe grew up in Melbourne, Florida. He attended Melbourne Central Catholic High School. Scaringe received his bachelor's degree in mechanical engineering from Rensselaer Polytechnic Institute. He then received a master's degree in mechanical engineering at the Massachusetts Institute of Technology (MIT) and went on to also receive a doctorate in mechanical engineering at MIT's Sloan Automotive Lab.

Personal life
Scaringe married Meagan McGone in Michigan in August 2014. The couple have three children together.

Rivian
Scaringe returned to Rockledge, Florida, and founded Mainstream Motors in 2009 as the sole employee. The company later changed its name to Rivian Automotive in 2011.

On November 10, 2021, Rivian went public, listing its shares on the Nasdaq.

Scaringe is chairman of the board and has 9.5% voting power. Additionally, he has complete veto power over board decisions due to his 100% ownership of the company's class B shares. In total, Scaringe owns about 1.4% of Rivian.

References 

American business executives
Electric vehicle industry
Living people
1983 births
Massachusetts Institute of Technology alumni
Rensselaer Polytechnic Institute alumni
American company founders